The OTO-Melara Mod 56 is an Italian-made 105 mm pack howitzer built and developed by OTO-Melara. It fires the standard US type M1 ammunition.

History
The OTO Melara 105 mm Mod 56 began life in the 1950s to meet the requirement for a modern light-weight howitzer that could be used by the Italian Army's Alpini brigades mountain artillery regiments. That it remained in service with those units a full half century after its introduction is a testament to the gun's quality. The Mod 56 has a number of unique characteristics for a weapon of its caliber, including the ability for its crew to manhandle the gun (due to its light weight), and the capability of being used in the direct fire role. Being a pack howitzer, it is designed to be broken down into 12 parts, each of which can be transported easily.

Its ability to be "knocked-down" allows the sections to be transported a number of ways, although the original design was for mule-pack using special pack saddles. More often it is towed by a light vehicle such as a jeep or Land Rover. With the shield removed it can be carried inside an M113 armored personnel carrier. Its particular attraction to Western armies in the 1960s was that its light weight meant it could be lifted in one piece by helicopter, which made the gun popular with light artillery units in many countries as well as the more specialized mountain and airborne troops. Overall, the Mod 56 has served in more than 30 countries worldwide, of which a partial listing of the major operators is below.

As an added refinement to the gun's mass, the Mod 56 is built to be an artillery piece with a reputation of ease with which it can be assembled and then disassembled into twelve components within minutes. The gun's light weight did have the drawback that it lacked the robustness necessary for sustained operations. Australian and New Zealand gunners in South Vietnam found the weapon unsuitable for continuous operations. The guns were replaced by the sturdy US-made M101A1 after some two years. The lack of durability also led to their being carried on trucks for longer distances outside the combat zone. The Mod 56 offered limited protection to its crew.

The Chinese manufacturer NORINCO offers a version of the Model 56 pack howitzer and its associated ammunition.

In Commonwealth service, the gun was known simply as the "L5 pack howitzer" with L10 ordnance. However, its lack of range and the indifferent lethality of its ammunition led the UK to start development of its replacement, the L118 light gun, only two years after the pack howitzer entered service. This provided them with an advantage in range when facing the Argentine OTO-Melaras during the Falklands war. Still, 105 mm bombardments accounted for a considerable share of all British casualties suffered in land battles during that conflict.

The gun became the standard equipment of the Allied Command Europe Mobile Force (AMF ACE Mobile Force (Land)) artillery, equipping the batteries provided by Canada, Belgium, Germany, Italy and the UK until 1975.

Combat service
Identified combat use includes:
 Argentine Army 3rd and 4th Artillery Groups during the 1982 Falklands War
 British Army during the Aden Emergency in South Yemen (1st Light Regiment Royal Horse Artillery and 19 Light Regiment RA) and Borneo (4, 6, 29 Cdo, 40, 45 and 95 Cdo Light Regiments RA)
 Australian Army during the Malayan Emergency in Borneo and Malaya (102 Field Battery) and during the Vietnam War in 1965–67 (and very limited use thereafter) by 101, 103, 105, 106 and 108 Field Batteries
 Malaysian Army in Borneo and Malaysian Peninsular during the Second Malayan Emergency (1968–1989)
 Nigerian Army during Nigerian Civil War. Some were captured by Biafrans.
 New Zealand Army deployed rotations of 4 guns during the Vietnam War (161 Battery of the 16th Field Regiment).
 Ukrainian Army in Bakhmut in March 2023

Operators

Current operators (2018)
 Argentina - 64 (Army) and 13 (Naval Infantry)
 Bangladesh - 170 
 Botswana - 6
 Brazil - 63
 Chile - 104
 Ecuador - 24
 Ghana
 Greece - 18
 India - 50
 Italy - 18
  Kenya - 7
 Malaysia - 110
  Nepal - 14
 Nigeria - 50
  Boko Haram: At least 1 captured from Nigeria
 Pakistan - 213
 Peru - 24 
 Philippines - 100 (Army) 20 (Marine Corps)
 San Marino - 2
 Spain - 161 (Army) and 24 (Naval Infantry)
 Sudan
 Thailand - 12
 Venezuela - 40 (Army) and 18 (Naval Infantry)
 Zambia - 18

Former operators

 Australia
 Austria
 Belgium - 2 in 2003
 Biafra - captured from Nigeria
 Burkina Faso - 2 in 2003
 Canada - 22 in 2003
 China - 2 in 2003
 Cyprus - 54 in 2003
 Djibouti - 1 in 2003
 Ethiopia - 2 in 2003
 France - 28 in 2003 
 Germany - 19 in 2003
 Indonesia - 10 in 2003
 Iraq - 118 in 2003
  Iran - 12 in 2003
 Kuwait - 6 in 2003
 Morocco - 16 in 2003
 New Zealand - 8 in 2003
 Portugal - Operated a total of 24
 Saudi Arabia - 24 in 2003
  Somalia - 89 in 2003
 United Arab Emirates - 18 in 2003
 United Kingdom - 52 in 2003 
 Yemen - 4 in 2003
  Yugoslavia. After its dissolution the guns come under control of the new states, as follows:
  Bosnia and Herzegovina - 3 in 2003
  Croatia - 2 in 2003
  Macedonia - 2 in 2003
  Serbia and Montenegro Federation - 17 in 2003
 Zimbabwe - 9 in 2003

References
Notes

105 mm artillery
Field artillery of the Cold War
Pack artillery
Artillery of Italy
OTO Melara
Artillery of Greece
Military equipment introduced in the 1950s